Cocula Municipality may refer to several municipalities in Mexico:
 Cocula Municipality, Guerrero
 Cocula Municipality, Jalisco